Bez naglih skokova (trans. Without Bounces) is the fourth studio album from Serbian and former Yugoslav rock band Galija.

The album was recorded at Strawberry Studios in Manchester, England, with production by Nightwing member Gordon Rowley. It was mixed at Rudy Records Studio, Hollywood, California.

Track listing
All the songs were written by Nenad Milosavljević (music) and Predrag Milosavljević (lyrics), except where noted. 
"Tačno u 5 i 30" – 4:04
"Ti me svojom hladnoćom ne kušaj" (N. Milosavljević, S. Yesenin)– 4:18
"Meksiko" – 4:51
"San" - 5:03
"Biću tu" (A. Lokner, P. Milosavljević) – 3:00
"Igraj kad si sam" – 2:58
"Bilo je dobro" – 4:00
"Jednom" – 5:07
"Pesma" – 2:52

Personnel
Nenad Milosavljević - vocals, acoustic guitar, harmonica
Predrag Milosavljević - vocals
Branislav Radulović - guitar
Zoran Radosavljević - bass guitar
Saša Lokner - keyboards
Boban Pavlović - drums, percussion

References 
 EX YU ROCK enciklopedija 1960-2006,  Janjatović Petar;  

Galija albums
1984 albums
PGP-RTB albums